Richard Stewart (born 1959) is the mayor for the city of Coquitlam, British Columbia. He was elected to Coquitlam City Council in 2005, and became mayor in 2008.

Personal life
He was married in 1983 to Anna Rosa, they have four children. Stewart has served his community in the provincial government as MLA for Coquitlam-Maillardville from 2001 to 2005; appointed MLA Responsible for Francophone Affairs, member of the Government Caucus Committee on the Economy, and Chair of the Select Standing Committee on Education.

Stewart is bilingual, speaking English and French.

Stewart has experience as a community volunteer in a large number of social, service, environmental, business and community organizations, including the Coquitlam Rotary Club, the Knights of Columbus, the Maillardville Lions Club, the Société Maillardville Uni and Société Francophone de Maillardville.

Career
Stewart was previously President of the Canadian Home Builders' Association of British Columbia, Chair of the National Housing Economic Research Council, a member of the BC Minister's Advisory Council on Affordable Housing, a member of National and BC Building Code Committees, and a member of the National Research Council Canada's Standing Committee on Housing.

At the local government level, Stewart has served on Economic Development Committees, on a local Advisory Design Panel, on Housing Committees, and as a Trustee on the Coquitlam Public Library Board. Stewart is a writer, and has operated his own publishing, government relations and communications business.

In 2004, MLA Elayne Brenzinger, then an independent, accused Stewart of improper conduct, claiming he had groped her. Though Brenzinger later retracted the allegations and issued an apology, Stewart was briefly suspended from office in his capacity as MLA.

On November 15, 2008, Stewart was elected as mayor of Coquitlam in the British Columbia municipal elections, beating out incumbent Maxine Wilson.

In 2016, Stewart revealed that he had been wearing the same suit to work events for the past fifteen months, in an effort to highlight the double standard that women in the public sphere, particularly in politics, are subject to over their appearance. He stated that while he had heard of female colleagues at both the municipal and provincial levels of government receiving negative comments about their outfits and hairstyles, particularly when they re-used outfits, he had never heard of a male politician receiving similar comments. Although his original intention was to carry on until someone noticed, he went public after fifteen months because "I was wearing the same suit to every meeting and (there was) no indication that anyone was ever going to notice."

In 2022, the Metro Vancouver Regional District, of which Coquitlam is a member, became involved in a dispute with construction company Acciona over a building project in North Vancouver. In fall 2022, a lawsuit filed by Metro Vancouver alleged that Anika Calder, the daughter of Coquitlam city manager Peter Steblin and an employee with Acciona, had used Stewart's login and password access confidential legal documents relating to this dispute, then provided copies of the documents to Acciona. , the city council has not commented on the allegations officially. In an interview in January 2023, Stewart stated that the details presented by Metro Vancouver "aren't entirely accurate," and suggested that additional information would be presented at trial.

City Councillor committees
 Chair of the Livable Communities Advisory Committee
 Chair of the Disability Issues Advisory Committee
 Chair of the Maillardville Revitalization Committee
 Member of the GVRD Labour Relations Bureau
 Chair of the Parcel Tax Review Panel
 Council representative to the Fraser-Burrard Community Justice Society
 Member of the Executive of Lower Mainland Municipal Association

References

External links
 Official website

Coquitlam city councillors
Franco-Columbian people
Living people
British Columbia Liberal Party MLAs
Mayors of places in British Columbia
21st-century Canadian politicians
Year of birth uncertain
1959 births